Osmoxylon mariannense is a rare species of tree in the family Araliaceae. It is endemic to Rota, one of the Northern Mariana Islands. A 2002 survey found only eight mature trees remaining on the island. A resident of the commonwealth, the tree is federally listed as an endangered species of the United States.

References

External links
USDA Plants Profile

Flora of the Northern Mariana Islands
Mariannense
Critically endangered plants
Taxonomy articles created by Polbot